Phil John (born 25 April 1981) is a Welsh rugby union footballer who currently plays at prop. His current team is RGC 1404, having left the Scarlets at the end of the 2015–16 season. He had represented the Scarlets for 17 years, making more than 300 appearances in that time.

John was born in Gorseinon. During his final season at the Scarlets, he was the only player in the squad which was part of the team that won the Celtic league in 2004.

External links
Profile at scarlets.co.uk

1981 births
Living people
Welsh rugby union players
Rugby union players from Gorseinon
Rugby union props
Scarlets players
RGC 1404 players
People educated at Ysgol y Strade